Cholamandalam Investment and Finance Company Limited (CIFCL) is a financial and investment service provider in India. It is headquartered in Chennai and has 1029 branches across the country. It is one of the 28 businesses under the Murugappa Group. It employees over 7,000 employees and also has about 16,000 people who assist in various business activities, with the majority being in smaller towns.

The company has total assets under management at Rs 54,279 crore with a Net income of Rs 1,885.34 crore as on 31 March 2019. The company was ranked 9th among the top 50 NBFCs in India by The Banking and Finance Post.

References

Financial services companies based in Chennai
Murugappa Group
Indian companies established in 1978
1978 establishments in Tamil Nadu
Financial services companies established in 1978
Companies listed on the National Stock Exchange of India
Companies listed on the Bombay Stock Exchange